Kazi Abdur Rashid was a Bangladesh Awami League politician and the former Member of Parliament from Gopalganj-1.

Career
Rashid fought in the Bangladesh Liberation war. He was elected to Parliament in 1991 from Gopalganj-1 as a Bangladesh Awami League candidate. He served as the administrator of Gopalganj District Council.

Death
Rashid died on 14 August 2014 in Dhaka, Bangladesh.

References

Awami League politicians
2014 deaths
5th Jatiya Sangsad members